Peter Njoroge Baiya (born 12 February 1963) is a Kenyan politician. He belongs to TNA, Jubilee and was elected to represent the Githunguri Constituency in the National Assembly of Kenya since the 2007 Kenyan parliamentary election.

References

Living people
Members of the National Assembly (Kenya)
Safina politicians
1963 births